Bud Bar is an artificial reef near Boynton Beach, Florida. The ship was renamed Budweiser Bar or Bud Bar because the company donated money to sink the ship.

External links
Budweiser Bar at Splashdown Divers

 

Artificial reefs
Ships built in Germany
Shipwrecks of the Florida coast
Maritime incidents in 1987
Ships sunk as artificial reefs
1987 establishments in Florida